Magnus Hellberg (born 4 April 1991) is a Swedish professional ice hockey goaltender for the  Detroit Red Wings of the National Hockey League (NHL). He has also played in the NHL for the Nashville Predators, New York Rangers, and Ottawa Senators.

Playing career
Hellberg was selected 38th overall by the Nashville Predators in the 2011 NHL Entry Draft and was the first goaltender selected in the draft.

Hellberg almost didn't make the trip from Sweden to St. Paul, Minnesota, for the draft, citing it was "50-50" that he'd even be drafted. Because of the last-minute decision to come, the only person with him was his agent.

Technically, he was the first player to wear the new, redesigned Nashville jersey. The team still had not unveiled the home gold version, and the road white debuted at the 2011 NHL Entry Draft. Additionally, the Predators did not have a first-round pick, giving Hellberg the honor of becoming the first player to wear it.

During the 2012–13 season, Hellberg appeared in 39 regular season games with the Milwaukee Admirals of the American Hockey League and two games with the Cincinnati Cyclones of the ECHL. He added four more games with Milwaukee during AHL post-season.

On 26 October 2013, Hellberg made his NHL debut with the Nashville Predators, playing 12 minutes after replacing starter Carter Hutton in a game against the St. Louis Blues. With the Predators system crowded at both NHL and AHL levels, he was assigned to ECHL affiliate, the Cyclones, to finish the 2013–14 season.

On 1 July 2015, Hellberg was traded to the New York Rangers for a 6th-round pick in the 2017 NHL Entry Draft.

Hellberg was assigned to the Hartford Wolf Pack upon his arrival in New York but was called up on 18 December to serve as a backup to Henrik Lundqvist while Antti Raanta was recovering from a head injury. Hellberg took the ice in a 20 December game against the Washington Capitals after Lundqvist allowed five goals, including four in the second period; Hellberg allowed two goals in the third period as the Rangers eventually lost the game 7–3. On 30 December, after Raanta was cleared to return, Hellberg was sent back down to the Wolf Pack.

Hellberg was called up to the NHL three times during the 2016–17 season; the first call-up came on 15 January 2017 after Raanta suffered a lower-body injury against the Montreal Canadiens. As a result, Hellberg was called up to the NHL to back up Lundqvist for one week while Raanta recovered. Hellberg took the ice once as he replaced Lundqvist during the third period of the Rangers 17 January game against the Dallas Stars; the Rangers lost the game 7–6 despite rallying from a 7–3 deficit. He was called up again in March after Lundqvist suffered a hip injury. He served as Raanta's backup for five games but did not see any ice time. Hellberg was called up a third time for a season-ending back-to-back set of games after Raanta suffered another lower-body injury. Hellberg sat on the bench as Lundqvist's backup in the first game (a 3–1 loss to the Ottawa Senators), but Hellberg made his first NHL start in the second game (Rangers' season finale) against the Pittsburgh Penguins. He stopped 22 of 24 shots as the Rangers won the game 3–2.

As an impending free agent, Hellberg left the NHL and signed a one-year contract to be the starting goaltender of Chinese club, Kunlun Red Star of the KHL, on 25 May 2017. In the 2017–18 season, despite registering just 16 wins in 51 games, Hellberg was a standout for the underperforming Kunlun, posting a .926 save percentage.

Having earlier signed a one-year extension with Kunlun during the season, Hellberg was traded the following off-season by the Red Star to perennial contending club, SKA Saint Petersburg, in exchange for financial compensation on 28 May 2018.

After three stellar seasons with SKA Saint Petersburg, Hellberg left the club at the conclusion of his contract and opted to continue in the KHL by agreeing to a one-year deal with HC Sochi on 15 June 2021. In the 2021–22 season, posted a respectable 2.42 goals-against average, and a .917 save percentage for five shutouts in 37 games with Sochi. Unable to help Sochi qualify for the post-season, Hellberg signed a one-year contract in a return to the NHL for the remainder of the Detroit Red Wings' season on 13 April 2022.

On 13 July 2022, Hellberg left the Red Wings as a free agent and was signed to a one-year, $750,000 contract with the Seattle Kraken. After attending the Kraken's 2022 training camp, Hellberg was placed on waivers during the pre-season to be re-assigned to the AHL. On 3 October 2022, Hellberg was claimed off waivers by the Ottawa Senators following an injury to starting goaltender Cam Talbot. On 10 November, after one appearance with Ottawa, Hellberg was placed on waivers by the Senators and was re-claimed by Seattle.

Hellberg served as the backup to Martin Jones through several games with the Kraken before he was placed on waivers after the return to health of goaltender Philipp Grubauer on 22 November. Without featuring for the Kraken, Hellberg was claimed off waivers by former club, the Detroit Red Wings, on 23 November 2022.

On 28 December 2022, Hellberg came into the game as relief for starter Ville Husso after Husso gave up four goals in the first period to the Pittsburgh Penguins. The Red Wings scored four unanswered goals to force overtime and went on to win 5-4, with Hellberg making 19 saves.

Career statistics

Regular season and playoffs

International

Awards and honours

References

External links
 

1991 births
Living people
Almtuna IS players
Cincinnati Cyclones (ECHL) players
Detroit Red Wings players
Frölunda HC players
Grand Rapids Griffins players
Hartford Wolf Pack players
HC Kunlun Red Star players
Milwaukee Admirals players
Nashville Predators draft picks
Nashville Predators players
New York Rangers players
Örebro HK players
Ottawa Senators players
SKA Saint Petersburg players
HC Sochi players
Sportspeople from Uppsala
Swedish ice hockey goaltenders
Ice hockey players at the 2022 Winter Olympics
Olympic ice hockey players of Sweden